William Dagger (born 21 February 1999) is an English professional rugby league footballer who plays as a  or on the  for Hull Kingston Rovers in the Betfred Super League. 

He has previously played for the Warrington Wolves in the Super League. Dagger has spent time on loan from Hull KR at the York City Knights in Betfred League 1, and at the Leigh Centurions and Featherstone Rovers in the Betfred Championship.

Background
Dagger was born in Castleford, West Yorkshire, England.

Playing career

Warrington Wolves (2017)
In 2017, he made his début for the Warrington Wolves against the Castleford Tigers in a 16-36 Super League defeat.

Hull Kingston Rovers (2018 - present)
In October 2017, Dagger signed a three-year contract to play for Hull Kingston Rovers in the Super League.

On 15 February 2018, he made his Hull Kingston Rovers' Super League bow, in a 23-4 victory over the Catalans Dragons.

Dagger made a total of five appearances for Hull KR in the 2021 Super League season including the club's 28-10 semi-final defeat against Catalans Dragons.

York City Knights (Dual Reg)
Will Dagger occasionally featured for the York City Knights in 2018, as part of Hull Kingston Rovers' dual registration partnership with the club.

Leigh Centurions (loan)
It was revealed on 26 July 2018, that Dagger would spend the remainder of the 2018 rugby league season at the Leigh Centurions, on a loan basis from his parent-club Hull Kingston Rovers.

Dagger was followed to the Leigh Centurions by two of his current Hull Kingston Rovers teammates in Josh Johnson and Jordan Walne as part of the same loan deal.

Dagger made his Leigh Centurions' début against the Sheffield Eagles on 29 July 2018, in a 34-10 triumph in the Championship league competition.

Dagger started the game in the  position and he recorded a try on his first appearance for the Leigh Centurions.

Featherstone Rovers (loan)
On 8 June 2021, it was reported that he had signed for Featherstone in the RFL Championship on loan.

References

External links
Hull KR profile
(archived by web.archive.org) Profile at warringtonwolves.com
SL profile

1999 births
Living people
English rugby league players
Featherstone Rovers players
Hull Kingston Rovers players
Leigh Leopards players
Rugby league fullbacks
Rugby league players from Castleford
Warrington Wolves players
York City Knights players